This list of episodes of Conan details information on the 2013 episodes of Conan, a television program on TBS hosted by Conan O'Brien. Conan hosted shows at The Tabernacle in Atlanta, Georgia between April 1–4. During the week of October 28–31, highlights of the past 20 years of Conan's show were shown.

2013

January

February

March

April

May

June

July

August

September

October

November

December

Notes
Paramore was the musical guest scheduled to appear on April 30, 2013. The band's appearance was cancelled shortly before the taping of the show due to lead singer Hayley Williams' illness.

References

Episodes (2013)
Conan
2013 in American television